An audio watermark is a unique electronic identifier embedded in an audio signal, typically used to identify ownership of copyright. It is similar to a watermark on a photograph.

Watermarking is the process of embedding information into a signal (e.g. audio, video or pictures) in a way that is difficult to remove. If the signal is copied, then the information is also carried in the copy. Watermarking has become increasingly important to enable copyright protection and ownership verification.

One of the most secure techniques of audio watermarking is spread spectrum audio watermarking (SSW). In SSW, a narrow-band signal is transmitted over a much larger bandwidth such that the signal energy presented in any signal frequency is undetectable. Thus the watermark is spread over many frequency bands so that the energy in one band is undetectable. An interesting feature of this watermarking technique is that destroying it requires noise of high amplitude to be added to all frequency bands. 
SSW is a robust watermarking technique because, to eliminate it, the attack must affect all possible frequency bands with modifications of considerable strength. This creates visible defects in the data.
Spreading spectrum is done by a pseudonoise (PN) sequence. In conventional SSW approaches, the receiver must know the PN sequence used at the transmitter as well as the location of the watermark in the watermarked signal for detecting hidden information. This is a high security feature, since any unauthorized user who does not have access to this information cannot detect any hidden information. Detection of the PN sequence is the key factor for detection of hidden information from SSW.
Although PN sequence detection is possible by using heuristic approaches such as evolutionary algorithms, the high computational cost of this task can make it impractical. Much of the computational complexity involved in the use of evolutionary algorithms as an optimization tool is due to the fitness function evaluation that may either be very difficult to define or be computationally very expensive. 

One of the recent proposed approaches—in fast recovering the PN sequence- is the use of fitness granulation as a promising "fitness approximation" scheme. With the use of the fitness granulation approach called "Adaptive Fuzzy Fitness Granulation (AFFG)", the expensive fitness evaluation step is replaced by an approximate model. When evolutionary algorithms are used as a means to extract the hidden information, the process is called Evolutionary Hidden Information Detection, whether fitness approximation approaches are used as a tool to accelerate the process or not.

See also
 Acoustic fingerprint
 Activated Content

References 

 M. Davarynejad, S. Sedghi, M. Bahrepour, C.W. Ahn, M. Akbarzadeh, C. A. Coello Coello, "Detecting Hidden Information from Watermarked Signal using Granulation Based Fitness Approximation", Applications of Soft Computing: From Theory to Praxis, Springer, Series: Advances in Intelligent and Soft Computing, Volume 58/2009, pp. 463–472, 2009.
 M. Davarynejad, C.W. Ahn, J. Vrancken, J. van den Berg, C .A. Coello Coello, "Evolutionary hidden information detection by granulation-based fitness approximation", Applied Soft Computing, Vol. 10(3), pp. 719–729, 2010, .

Digital audio
Digital watermarking